Paul Delaney is a senior lecturer and professor of physics and astronomy at York University in Toronto. He is also the director of the Division of Natural Science within the Faculty of Science at York, as well as the Master of Bethune College at York.

Delaney has his master's degree in science. He has taught at York University since 1986. He earned his Bachelor of Science in experimental physics at the Australian National University in Canberra and his master's degree in astronomy at the University of Victoria. Delaney has been the recipient of many faculty of science and engineering awards at York University. One of his classes deals with the possibility of life on Mars. Delaney is also the director of the observatory at the York University, and its outreach program. In the past, he has also worked as a nuclear physicist at the Atomic Energy of Canada, and a support astronomer with the McGraw-Hill Observatory in Tucson, Arizona.

He holds both Australian and Canadian citizenship, and resides in Simcoe County with his wife - whom he met while attending the University of Victoria - and their two sons.

References

Living people
Scientists from Ontario
Canadian nuclear physicists
Academic staff of York University
People from Simcoe County
University of Victoria alumni
Sandford Fleming Award recipients
Australian National University alumni
20th-century Canadian astronomers
21st-century Canadian astronomers
Year of birth missing (living people)